Renee Erickson may refer to:

 Renee Erickson (chef) (born 1972), Seattle-based chef
 Renee Erickson (politician), American school principal and politician from Kansas